This is a list of notable inmates of Alcatraz Federal Penitentiary.
An inmate register reveals that there was 1576 prisoners in total which were held at Alcatraz during its time as a Federal Penitentiary, between  1934 to 1963, although figures reported have varied and some have stated 1557.

List of notable prisoners

 Clarence Anglin and John Anglin - The Anglin Brothers escaped with Frank Morris in the  June 1962 Alcatraz escape)
 Harvey Bailey ("The Dean of American Bank Robbers")
 Basil Banghart ("The Owl")
 Arthur Barker ("Doc")
 Albert L. Bates
 Mason Derulo
 James Boarman
 Andrew Uzzel ("Dutch")
 Harold Brest
 James "Whitey" Bulger
 Al Capone ("Scarface Al")
 Clarence Carnes
 Meyer Cohen ("Mickey")
 Theodore Cole ("Ted")
 Cole "The Big Man" Bruce
 Joseph Paul Cretzer
 Dillon "The Clout Master" Hamilton
 Volney Davis ("Curley")
 Herbert Allen Farmer ("Deafy")
 Rufus Franklin
 William Magoof
 Floyd Hamilton
 Ellsworth Raymond Johnson ("Bumpy")
 Alvin Francis Karpavicz ("Creepy Karpis")
 George Kelly Barnes ("Machine Gun Kelly")
 Thomas R. Limerick
 Charles Joseph Lovett (AZ616)
 James C. Lucas ("Texas Bank Robber")
 Rafael Cancel Miranda
 Rufus McCain
 Rufe Persful
 Burton Phillips
 Ralph Roe
 Harry Sawyer
 Sam Shockley
 Robert Simmons
 Morton Sobell
 Robert Stroud ("Birdman of Alcatraz")
 James Edward Testerman (AZ716)
 Henri Young
 Irving Wexler ("Waxey Gordon")
 Christopher Pekson ("Pekspeks")
 Forrest Tucker
 John Elgin Johnson
 Robert Luke (AZ1118)
 Marcus Forbes
 William Garnett Baker (AZ1259)

References

External links
 Alphabetical Index of Former Inmates of U.S. Penitentiary, Alcatraz, 1934-63, from Records of the Bureau of Prisons 
 Numerical Index of Former Inmates of U.S. Penitentiary, Alcatraz, 1934-63, from alcatrazhistory.com

 
San Francisco Bay Area-related lists
Crime in the San Francisco Bay Area
Lists of prisoners and detainees